The 30mm Type 2 cannon was a Japanese Navy autocannon used during World War II. It was a scaled-up version of the 20mm Oerlikon FF cannon.

Specifications
Caliber: 30 mm (1.2 in)
Ammunition: 30 x 92RB
Weight: 51 kg (112 lb)
Rate of fire: 380 rounds/min
Muzzle velocity: 710 m/s (2,330 ft/s)

References
 
 Gustin Emmanuel, The WWII Fighter Gun Debate: Gun Tables  (1999)

30 mm artillery
Autocannon
Aircraft guns
World War II weapons of Japan